The discography of Capital Kings, an American Christian pop and electronic band, consists of two studio albums, one remix album, three EPs, singles, videos and remixes.

Albums

Studio

EPs

Singles

Other charted songs

Music videos

As lead artist

As featured artist

Cameo appearances

Guest appearances

Remixes

Compilation appearances

References 

Discographies of American artists
Christian music discographies